The International Union of Students (IUS) was a worldwide nonpartisan association of university student organizations.

The IUS was the umbrella organization for 155 such students' organizations across 112 countries and territories representing approximately 25 million students. This was recognised by the United Nations granting the IUS a consultative status in UNESCO. The primary aim of the IUS was to defend the rights and interests of students to promote improvement in their welfare and standard of education and to prepare them for their tasks as democratic citizens.  It collapsed in the 2000s due to an unreliable membership system and a lack of grassroots engagement.

Aim and work areas
The aims of the IUS were spelled out in the 1946 preamble to the organization's Constitution:

The purpose of the International Union of Students, which is founded upon the representative student organizations of different countries, shall be to defend the rights and interests of students to promote improvement in their welfare and standard of education and to prepare them for their tasks as democratic citizens.

According to the IUS's entry in the UNESCO Non-Governmental Organization list, the priority work areas of the IUS were: "Exchange of information, defence of students' status, peace, environment, development, human rights".

Activities
The IUS worked through:

Issuing Student Statements
Circular News Letters and Calls for Action to members
Celebration of the International Students' Day on November 17
Organizing Student Conferences

Logo symbolism
The logo and flag of the IUS is a burning torch and an open book set against the red and blue outline of a stylized globe. It symbolizes youth's persistent quest for knowledge.

History

Early history 1946–1956 
The International Union of Students was founded in Prague on August 27, 1946. Student organizations from 62 countries participated in its founding envisioning a more inclusive successor to the short lived 1941-1944 International Council of Students (also known as the International Students' Council) which was set up on the initiative of the British National Union of Students to maintain open lines of communication with student organizations in allied countries during World War II.

From its earliest inception, the IUS was marked by a fundamental schism:

"The spirit of [post-war] co-operation and the desire to prevent a resurgence of fascism in Europe brought together otherwise divergent groups. The main divisions, evident even at the founding congress, were between the Communist student organizations, which gained control of the executive bodies of the IUS from the beginning, and the student unions from western Europe, many of which were primarily interested in preserving the idea of a non-political international agency which would provide concrete services to the students of various countries"

In response to the increasingly partisan Communist course of the IUS and the broad powers of its secretariat and executive committee to initiate new policy programmes on behalf of the members, several non-Communist members withdrew their membership in the following years. Following which the IUS also referred itself as Independent Federation of Left-Wing and Alternative Student Unions.

Consequently, 21 such break-away national students organizations met in Stockholm in 1950 to form the International Student Conference (ISC) as a nonpartisan rival organization to the pro-Communist IUS. Notable among these founders was the United States National Student Association (USNSA or NSA) though "Anglo-Saxons, Scandinavians and Dutch wielded the greatest influence [in the ISC]".

At the time of the formation of the ISC, the dominant view in later analyses is that the IUS had become Communist controlled to such a degree that it is often referred to as a Soviet Union Communist front organization with the IUS and ISC aligned along the Cold War fronts toward the Soviet Union and the United States of America respectively.

A dissenting view that the IUS was strongly influenced by socialism and communism but not de facto controlled by Soviet Communist interests, has also been expressed, however, by Trotskyist Lawrence Brammer:

"It is significant that several former IUS officers later became outspoken liberals in Czechoslovakia and in the French and Italian Communist Parties. The outward pro-Soviet orientation of the IUS often obscured real differences within the organization"

IUS activities in this period included Student Games held by the IUS Sports Council. The first such games were held in Paris in 1946 and were subsequently integrated into the World Youth Festivals (also known as World Festival of Youth and Students) which the IUS co-sponsored with the equally Communist oriented World Federation of Democratic Youth (WFDY).

Such festivals brought up to 30,000 youth and students together for a social, cultural and sporting event (see World Federation of Democratic Youth).

IUS from 1956–1969 
From 1956 onwards, the IUS and ISC competed to attract student unions non-aligned in the Cold War sense. Focus was on Latin America, Asia and Africa and recruitment of member unions from here resulted in a broader political base for the IUS.

Activities in this period included among others regional student seminars, donation of duplication machines and cameras to help affiliates, the establishment of student Health Centres in India, international student conferences as well as the publication in German, Russian and Czech of the World Student News journal of the IUS, the Democratic Education journal of the IUS, and topical pamphlets concerning education. More spectacularly, the IUS continued to co-sponsor World Youth Festivals with the World Federation of Democratic Youth (WFDY).

It was well known from the outset that the IUS was funded by Soviet and Czech government contributions:

"The cost of international meetings, large-scale publications, and the other activities in which they engage, are beyond the financial resources of university students"

However, the IUS's inability to win leadership in left-wing student movements in Europe despite its many activities caused the Soviet Union to re-evaluate its support.

The major challenge for the IUS in this period turned out to be its preoccupation with an ideological agenda rather than a focus on actual student concerns and affairs. As a consequence of this stance, the organization became detached from its student base and was circumvented by grassroots movements in, e.g. the planning of international anti-war demonstrations in relation to the Vietnam War. The major achievements of the IUS in this period were therefore firstly helping create national student unions in developing countries and secondly aiding student union members with information and idea exchange.

The dissolution of the IUS's rival organization the International Student Conference (ISC) owing to lack of funds became a reality in 1969. The demise of the ISC were hastened by the 1967 revelation that the CIA had indirectly funded the ISC and recruited student representatives from the United States National Student Association (USNSA) to actively oppose Communism in the IUS. This undermined both the financial and student political support of the ISC leaving, once again, the IUS as the only worldwide student organization.

IUS from 1970–present 
This period in IUS history is marked by the chairmanship of the same chairman from 1977 to 1986 under whom a flurry of international IUS activity took place in 1979.

The most significant event of the period for the IUS, however, was the turmoil the organization encountered after the 1989 - 1991 fall of Communism (see also World Federation of Democratic Youth) during which the IUS lost most of its funding. Additionally, in August 1991, the Czechoslovak Minister of the Interior decided to expel the IUS and other Communist front organizations from Czechoslovakia. The reasons given for the expulsion were close ties with the old Communist regime and abuse of tax privileges granted during the old Communist regime.

Despite the hardships caused by the changing power dynamics of the 1990s, the organization elected a new leadership at its 1992 Cyprus Congress and initiated structural changes of its Constitution to renew itself and evolve beyond its Communist past:

"At the 16th Congress of the International Union of Students (IUS), which took place in January 1992 in Larnaca, Cyprus, the organisation underwent major changes, including the development of a new constitution. These initiatives were adopted to establish the basis for a more democratic, representative, and independent international student organisation"

The new leadership and its successors continued to make press appearances in, e.g., relation to International Students' Day celebration in Dublin in 1994 and the 1998 UNESCO World Conference on Higher Education.

In August 2003, the International Union of Students marked a comeback by calling for a worldwide day of protest against the inclusion of Higher Education in the WTO's General Agreement on Trade in Services.

The IUS is still, however, struggling with its expulsion from its Prague headquarters as of October 2006:

"Most cold war institutions shriveled in the 1990s, along with their superpower backing. The big communist front outfits that fought propaganda wars, awash with cash and stuffed with spies, have fizzled away in a mixture of apathy and swindles. This week's court-enforced auction of a hulking concrete pile in the heart of Prague belonging to one of them, the International Union of Students, was halted amid squabbles among its dozens of creditors"

Members
The IUS had the following members:

See also
 Student activism
 World Federation of Democratic Youth
 World Peace Council
 International Association of Democratic Lawyers
 Women's International Democratic Federation
 World Federation of Trade Unions

Notes

Further reading
 Cornell, Richard (1965): Youth And Communism: An Historical Analysis of International Communist Youth Movements; Walker & Co.: New York
 Clews, John (1952): Students Unite: The International Union of Students and Its Work; foreword by S. Spender, Congress for Cultural Freedom; British Society for Cultural Freedom: Paris (ASIN: B0000CIEJO)
 Maanen, Gert Van (1966): The International Student Movement. History and Background; International Documentation and Information Centre: The Hague

External links 
 Official website
 Old (2002) website
 ESU - The European Students' Union: The International Student Movement during the Cold War (1946 - 1969)
 Communist international front organizations: An analysis of the international union of students  by John Jay Barr

Groups of students' unions
International organizations based in the Czech Republic
Students' unions
International student organizations
Organizations based in Prague
Communist front organizations
Student wings of communist parties
Student organizations established in 1946